Nicole Heaston (born in USA) is an American soprano. She has sung for the Norwegian National Opera, and the Houston Grand Opera.  She has sung the role of Rosina in the Marriage of Figaro in the Boston Lyric Opera and the San Francisco Opera.

References

Year of birth missing (living people)
Living people
American operatic sopranos
21st-century American women opera singers